Aleksander Ignacy Lubomirski (1802–1893) was a Polish noble, financier and philanthropist.

Son of Ksawery Lubomirski, he had no children. Made a fortune investing in the Suez Canal Company.

References

1802 births
1893 deaths
Aleksander Ignacy